The Anglo-Portuguese Army was the combined British and Portuguese army that participated in the Peninsular War, under the command of Arthur Wellesley. The Army is also referred to as the British-Portuguese Army and, in Portuguese, as the Exército Anglo-Luso or the Exército Anglo-Português.

The Anglo-Portuguese Army was established with the British Army deployed to the Iberian Peninsula under the command of General Arthur Wellesley, and the Portuguese Army rebuilt under the leadership of British General William Beresford and the Portuguese War Secretary Miguel Pereira Forjaz. The new Portuguese battalions were supplied with British equipment, trained to British standards and thoroughly re-organised. Incompetent or corrupt officers were cashiered and appropriate replacements were appointed or promoted from amongst promising Non-commissioned officers.

On 22 April 1809, Wellesley became Commander-in-Chief of the British Army in the Peninsula, replacing General Cradock, whose assessment of the military situation the British government found too pessimistic. At the same time he was appointed by the Portuguese Government as Commander-in-Chief of the Portuguese Army. He then came to have the two armies under his command, transforming them into a single integrated army.

The Army was organised into divisions, most of them including mixed British-Portuguese units. Usually, each one had two British and one Portuguese brigades. In the elite Light Division, the brigades themselves were mixed, each including two British light infantry and one Portuguese Caçadores battalions.

Order of battle
The following tables show the order of battle and commanders of the Anglo-Portuguese Army at various stages in the Peninsular War.

See also
 Army of Spain (Peninsular War)
 Lines of Torres Vedras
 King's German Legion
 Anglo-Portuguese Alliance

References

Bibliography
 
 
 
 
 
 
 
 
 
 
 
 
 

Military units and formations established in 1809
Military units and formations of the Napoleonic Wars
Military units and formations of the Peninsular War
British light infantry
King's German Legion
Peninsular War
Portuguese Army